Arch Hurd is an operating system based on Arch Linux, but uses the GNU Hurd kernel instead of the Linux kernel.

The Arch Hurd project was founded on an Arch Linux forum thread in January 2010 and, after a few weeks with many contributions, progressed to the point where it could boot in a virtual machine. It aims to provide an Arch-like user environment (BSD-style init scripts, i686-optimised packages, use of the pacman package manager, rolling-release, and a KISS set up) on the Hurd which is stable enough for use.

, the official packages were last updated in May 2019.

Despite having a small development team, much progress has been made since its founding, such as booting on real hardware, packaging everything for a basic web server, and the production of an unofficial graphical LiveCD.

In June 2011, Arch Hurd announced successful integration of Device Driver Environment (DDE) — the framework for Linux drivers on Hurd, which improves the network hardware support in the distribution and makes it nearly usable.

See also
 GNU Hurd
 Arch Linux
 Hurd variants
 Debian GNU/Hurd

References

External links
 Official Page (archived version)

Free software operating systems
Unix variants
Microkernel-based operating systems
Operating system distributions bootable from read-only media
Rolling Release Linux distributions